Eugene Booker McDaniels (February 12, 1935 – July 29, 2011) was an American singer and songwriter. He had his greatest recording success in the early 1960s, reaching number three on the U.S. Billboard Hot 100 singles chart with "A Hundred Pounds of Clay" and number five with "Tower Of Strength," both hits in 1961. He had continued success as a songwriter with titles including "Compared to What" and Roberta Flack's "Feel Like Makin' Love".

Background

Born in Kansas City, Kansas, McDaniels grew up in Omaha, Nebraska. As well as singing gospel music in church, he developed a love of jazz learning to play the saxophone and trumpet. After forming a singing group, the Echoes of Joy, later known as the Sultans, in his teens, he studied at the University of Omaha Conservatory of Music before joining the Mississippi Piney Woods Singers, with whom he toured in California.

Career

1960s–1970s 
In California McDaniels began singing in jazz clubs, achieving recognition  with the Les McCann Trio, and came to the attention of Sy Waronker of Liberty Records.

After recording two unsuccessful singles and an album, McDaniels teamed with producer Snuff Garrett, with whom he recorded his first hit, "A Hundred Pounds of Clay", which reached number 3 in the Billboard Hot 100 chart in early 1961 and sold over one million copies, earning gold disc status. Its follow-up, "A Tear", was less successful but his third single with Garrett, "Tower of Strength", co-written by Burt Bacharach, reached number 5 and won McDaniels his second gold record. "Tower of Strength" reached number 49 in the UK Singles Chart, losing out to Frankie Vaughan's chart-topping version.

In 1962, McDaniels appeared performing "Another Tear Falls" in the movie It's Trad, Dad! directed by Richard Lester. He continued to have hit records, including "Chip Chip", "Point Of No Return", and "Spanish Lace". Each record was released in 1962, but his suave style of singing gradually became less fashionable. In 1965 "Point Of No Return" was recorded by the British R&B band Georgie Fame and the Blue Flames on their UK Columbia EP Fame At Last. Also in 1965, McDaniels moved to Columbia Records, with little success, and in 1968, after the assassination of Dr. Martin Luther King, he left the US to live in Denmark and Sweden where he concentrated on songwriting.

After the late 1960s, McDaniels turned his attention to a more black consciousness form of music, and his best-known song in this genre was "Compared to What", a jazz-soul protest song made famous (and into a hit) by Les McCann and Eddie Harris on their album Swiss Movement. It was also covered by Roberta Flack, Ray Charles, Della Reese, John Legend, the Roots, Sweetwater, and others. He returned to the US in 1971 and recorded thereafter as Eugene McDaniels.

McDaniels also attained the top spot on the chart as a songwriter. In 1974, Flack reached number 1 with his "Feel Like Makin' Love" (not to be confused with the Bad Company song of the same name), which received a Grammy Award nomination. McDaniels received a BMI award for outstanding radio airplay; at the time he was given the award, the song already had over five million plays.

In the early 1970s, McDaniels recorded on the Atlantic label, which released his albums Headless Heroes of the Apocalypse and Outlaw.

1980s–2000s 
In the 1980s, McDaniels recorded an album with the percussionist Terry Silverlight, which was not released. In 2005, McDaniels released Screams & Whispers on his own record label.

In 2009, it was announced that McDaniels was to release a new album, Evolution's Child, which featured his lyrics, and a number of songs composed or arranged with pianist Ted Brancato. Some of the songs featured jazz musician Ron Carter on concert bass and Terri Lyne Carrington on drums. McDaniel's "Jagger the Dagger" was featured on the Tribe Vibes breakbeat compilation album, after it had been sampled by A Tribe Called Quest.

McDaniels also appeared in films. They included It's Trad, Dad! (1962, released in the United States as Ring-A-Ding Rhythm), which was directed by Richard Lester. McDaniels also appeared in The Young Swingers (1963). He is briefly seen singing in the choir in the 1974 film Uptown Saturday Night. He was the original voice actor for "Nasus", a champion in the computer game League of Legends.

In 2010 he launched a series of YouTube videos on his website, featuring his music and thoughts on some of his creations.

Personal life and death

McDaniels lived as a self-described "hermit" in the state of Maine.

McDaniels died peacefully on July 29, 2011, at his home, survived by his third wife and six  children.

Discography

Albums

As Universal Jones

Singles

As Universal Jones

Sideman

Produced by Eugene McDaniels
 Richard Roundtree, "The Man From Shaft" 1972
 Merry Clayton, Keep Your Eye on the Sparrow 1975
 Gladys Knight & The Pips, 2nd Anniversary 1975
 Melba Moore, Peach Melba 1975
 Gene McDaniels, Natural Juices 1975
 Nancy Wilson, This Mother's Daughter 1976
 Jimmy Smith, Sit on It 1977
 The Voltage Brothers, "The Voltage Brothers" 1978
 The Floaters, Float Into the Future 1979
 Jennifer Rush "Loving is a Good Thing" 1980
 Phyllis Hyman, "Meet Me on the Moon", 1991
 Carri Coltrane, The First Time 1999
 Carri Coltrane, Flamenco Sketches 1998
 Eugene McDaniels, Screams and Whispers 2004

Filmography
 It's Trad, Dad! (a.k.a. Ring-A-Ding Rhythm, 1962)
 The Young Swingers (1963)
 Roots (1977 miniseries) (1977)
 Devils Minion (2009)

Video game roles
 League of Legends – Nasus (voice-actor)

References

External links
 
 

1935 births
2011 deaths
Musicians from Kansas City, Missouri
African-American male singer-songwriters
American rhythm and blues singer-songwriters
American soul singers
Liberty Records artists
Singer-songwriters from Missouri
20th-century African-American male singers
21st-century African-American male singers